Rock Hill College was a boys' boarding school located in Ellicott City, Maryland. The school was divided into two departments: preparatory (for ages nine and up) and collegiate. The curriculum was based on physical education, sciences, and classical studies

Rock Hill College was founded in 1824 as Rock Hill Academy and purchased in 1857 by the Institute of the Brothers of the Christian Schools (known as the Christian Brothers); Rock Hill College is sometimes referred in older publications as the Christian Brothers College. In 1865 The College was incorporated as Howard County's only college and construction of the four-story stone building was completed. During the Civil War, the college basement served as a hospital for Northern and Southern troops. In 1866, Brother Azarias (Patrick Francis Mullany) was called to be a professor of mathematics and literature at Rock Hill College. He was President of Rock Hill from 1879 to 1886. Baltimore architect George A. Frederick was involved in the architectural design of Rock Hill College. Classes included Greek and Latin. Though not a parochial school, St. Paul's Catholic Church in Ellicott City created a chapel for the students of Rock Hill College in 1859. The side chapel eventually became part of the church proper.

The building was destroyed by fire on 16 January 1923 while most were in attendance at a basketball game.  A chimney fire spread to the dormitory roof, burning all but the gymnasium. The school merged with Calvert Hall College High School in Baltimore. A new elementary school was built within the existing walls in 1926 and remained until 1976, when Worthington Elementary School opened. In 1991, the property was rehabilitated into Greystone condominiums, a residential condominium and townhouse development.

Notable alumni
Louis Hamman (1877–1946), American physician

References

Burned buildings and structures in the United States
Defunct schools in Maryland
Schools in Howard County, Maryland
Educational institutions established in 1824
1824 establishments in Maryland
1922 disestablishments in Maryland
Buildings and structures in Ellicott City, Maryland